Outer Manipur Lok Sabha constituency is one of the two Lok Sabha (parliamentary) constituencies in Manipur, a state in northeastern India. The seat is reserved for scheduled tribes.

Vidhan Sabha segments
Outer Manipur Lok Sabha constituency is composed of the following assembly segments:

Members of Lok Sabha

Election results

General Election 2024

General Election 2019

General Election 2014

General Election 2009

General Election 2004

General Election 1962
 Rishang (SOC) : 35,621 votes  
 Sibo Larho (INC) : 35579

See also
 List of Constituencies of the Lok Sabha

References

External links
Outer Manipur lok sabha  constituency election 2019 date and schedule

Churachandpur district
Ukhrul district
Lok Sabha constituencies in Manipur